Pangium is a genus containing the sole species Pangium edule, a tall tree native to the mangrove swamps of Southeast Asia (Indonesia and Papua New Guinea).  It produces a large poisonous fruit (the "football fruit" or pangi) which can be made edible by fermentation. It is dioecious, with male and female flowers produced on separate individuals.

The taxonomy of the tree is uncertain and it may also be classed in the Flacourtiaceae or the Violales.

Description
The tree can reach  in height. The leaves are heart-shaped. The brownish fruit grows in clusters and shaped like a pear.

Cultivation
The tree requires many years to mature and the seeds are therefore most frequently harvested from wild trees, as it is not economically feasible to cultivate. Although poisonous to humans, the seeds of the tree form part of the natural diet of the babirusa (Babyroussa babyrussa).

Uses 

The fresh fruit and seeds contain hydrogen cyanide and are deadly poisonous if consumed without prior preparation. The seeds are first boiled and then buried in ash, banana leaves and earth for forty days, during which time, they turn from a creamy white colour to dark brown or black. The method relies on the fact that the hydrogen cyanide released by the boiling and fermentation is water-soluble and easily washed out.

In West Java and Jakarta,  or snakehead fish in  paste soup is a popular traditional dish in Betawi cuisine. The Toraja dish  (black spice with fish or meat, also sometimes with vegetables) uses the black  powder. In Singapore and Malaysia, the seeds are best known as an essential ingredient in ayam (chicken) or babi (pork) , a mainstay of Peranakan cuisine. Dusun tribe from Borneo use this pounded kernel as main ingredient for making local signature dish called , sour taste fermented fish.

People of Minahasa tribe in North Sulawesi use young leaves as vegetable. The leaves will be sliced into small part then it is cooked by mixing with herbs and pork fat or meat inside bamboo. Many sellers in Tomohon traditional market sell the leaves whether sliced or not.

Nutrition 
The edible portions of the plant are an excellent source of vitamin C and high in iron.

References 

Achariaceae
Edible nuts and seeds
Monotypic Malpighiales genera
Dioecious plants
Potentially dangerous food